Mansour Bahrami (born 26 April 1956) is a former professional tennis player. He is Iranian with dual French nationality since 1989. While not highly successful on the ATP Tour, his showmanship has made him a long-standing and popular figure in invitational tournaments.

Early Life
As a child in Iran, Mansour Bahrami taught himself to play tennis using an old metal frying pan and other kitchen utensils and did not own his first tennis racquet till he was aged 13. 

In his early 20s, following Iran's Islamic Revolution in the late 1970s, tennis was viewed as a capitalist and elitist sport and therefore banned. Because all tennis courts in Iran were closed down, he spent the next three years playing backgammon daily in Tehran, until he won a local tournament with the prize of airplane flights to Athens. He paid to have the tickets changed to Nice and left his girlfriend and family behind. 

France offered Bahrami the opportunity to play small tournaments, but he saw that cost of living was quite high and needed a way to maintain his finances until he could begin winning prize money. He gambled his savings in a casino in Nice and lost the lot on his first night. When his French visa ran out and without a carte de séjour, he became a political refugee, an illegal immigrant, constantly in fear of the police, regularly sleeping rough and making food last for days. He relied on the financial support of friends until he was able to support himself.

Tennis career
Mansour Bahrami reached the Davis Cup team at the age of 16. 

Due to the forced break in his tennis play from the revolution fallout, his potential in singles were never fully realized. He became a successful doubles player, winning two tournaments and reaching the 1989 French Open doubles final with Éric Winogradsky.

Senior tournaments
Bahrami has been a mainstay of the seniors invitational tennis circuit for more than 25 years. Bahrami is considered to have "found his niche" on the ATP Champions Tour, where his flamboyant, humorous style and propensity for trick shots make him a crowd favorite in the tour's more entertainment-oriented sphere. In reference to his showmanship, his 2009 English-language autobiography was titled The Court Jester. His comic turns on the court often include faking serves, slow-motion miming, hitting balls backwards between his legs, over his shoulder or from the back, and playing while laying down or seated.

ATP career finals

Doubles: 12 (2–10)

Challenger finals

Doubles: 5 (3–2)

Bibliography and filmography
 
 
 The Man behind the Moustache, DVD (2009).

Notes

References

External links
 
 
 
 
 Official website

French male tennis players
Iranian emigrants to France
Iranian male tennis players
Naturalized citizens of France
People from Arak, Iran
Sportspeople of Iranian descent
1956 births
Living people